Kermit Nathern Dial (January 10, 1908 – April 14, 1982) was an American Negro league infielder in the 1930s.

A native of Chicago, Illinois, Dial made his Negro leagues debut in 1932 with the Chicago American Giants. He played for the Columbus Blue Birds the following season, and finished his career in 1937 with the Detroit Stars. Dial died in Chicago in 1982 at age 74.

References

External links
 and Seamheads

1908 births
1982 deaths
Chicago American Giants players
Columbus Blue Birds players
Detroit Stars (1937) players
Baseball players from Chicago
20th-century African-American sportspeople
Baseball infielders